The flag of Åland is a yellow or gold Nordic cross with another red cross inside on a blue background with the vertical bar shifted towards the hoist side. It is intended to resemble the Swedish flag defaced by a red cross symbolizing Finland. The flag was officially adopted as the flag of Åland in 1954 and first hoisted in Mariehamn on 3 April 1954. Prior to autonomy, an unofficial horizontal bicolour triband of blue-yellow-blue was in use until it was made illegal in 1935.

The dimensions of the Ålandish flag are 16:3:4:3:26 horizontally and 12:3:4:3:12 vertically.

History 
When Finland obtained independence from Russia in 1917, many Ålanders feared they would lose their Swedish culture and language which led to the native population starting a movement to unite with Sweden. This led to Finland, Sweden, and Russia appealing to the  League of Nations, who decided in favour of Ålander autonomy. Starting in the early 1920s, Åland unofficially used a blue and yellow tricolour flag until it was banned in 1935 by the Finnish government. In 1952, new laws gave Åland the right to make its own flag and a proposed flag resembling the Swedish flag with a blue cross inside was rejected by the president. The final design ended up being the first proposed model with a red cross inside to represent Finland.

Colors

Gallery

See also
 Åland
 Åland's Autonomy Day
 Coat of arms of Åland

References

External links

 
Flags of Åland Island

Flags of Finland
Flag
Nordic Cross flags
Åland
Flags introduced in 1954